Manor Way was a railway station on East Ham Manor Way, south of Beckton in east London, on the London & St. Katharine Docks Company's line. It opened in November 1880 between Central and Gallions stations on the Gallions branch of the line, and was re-sited to the east side of the Manor Way in 1887.

Manor Way was sparingly used by passenger services, which ceased in 1940 after wartime bombing, and the goods line closed with the subsequent closure of the Royal Docks. With the redevelopment of the Docklands region in the 1980s and 1990s, the line was replaced in 1994 by the Docklands Light Railway extension to Beckton.

Railway stations in Great Britain opened in 1880
Railway stations in Great Britain closed in 1940
Disused railway stations in the London Borough of Newham
1880 establishments in England
1940 disestablishments in England